Niña Niño is a Philippine television drama series broadcast by TV5. It aired from April 5, 2021 to May 19, 2022 on the network's Todo Max Primetime evening line up, replacing Paano ang Pangako?.

The show Originally aired every weekday until the start of the 2021 FIBA Asia Cup Qualifiers, in which after the 2021 PBA season started, the show stopped airing episodes on Wednesdays and Fridays.

Series overview

Episodes
           

Episodes notes

References

Lists of Philippine drama television series episodes